The Agapia is a left tributary of the river Topolița in Romania. It flows into the Topolița near Săcălușești.

References

Rivers of Romania
Rivers of Neamț County